Worser Bay in Wellington, New Zealand is along the beach from Seatoun and over the hill from Miramar on the Miramar Peninsula. It has a calm sandy beach with a road running along the base of the Seatoun Heights hill. Houses run all along the hill side of the road, with only carparks and beach facilities opposite.

The beach is subject to the windy conditions of Wellington with gusty northerlies often changing to cold, consistent southerlies. The waters are calm as the beach is within the natural harbour and in summer it is a popular destination for families, much like the nearby Scorching Bay.

Named after James Heberley's frequent predictions of "worser" weather, the beach still has the original pilot's cottage that housed James and other pilots from 1866.

Features

The Worser Bay yacht club, scout hall and surf club buildings are located at the northern end of the beach.

The Worser Bay Boating Club was founded in 1926 and has become a leader in the New Zealand-specific Sunburst class dinghy yacht. There is also a strong emphasis on youth sailing in Optimist, P-Class and Starling dinghies. Of late, 420s and Skiffs have become increasing popular. Along with a number of national champions, in 2002 Greg Wilcox won the World OK dinghy championships at Napier, New Zealand.

The Sea Scouts hall was built in 1967 on top of a wartime Mine Control Building, which has since been converted to hold the dinghy yachts and rowing boats. Numbers dwindled in the 1990s, but the Cub Scouts are currently enjoying a resurgence.

The Worser Bay Surf Lifesaving Club was founded in 1910, competing in the many surf lifesaving events around the country. While it lasted many years beyond that of the Scorching Bay Lifesaving Club, the numbers at Worser Bay dwindled until the 1990s when official functions at the club ceased (the complete lack of surf did not help). Near the end of the decade a windsurf school began using the facilities. This would seem to have stirred the club and it reopened as a lifesaving club in the 2000s, focusing on youth.

Demographics
Worser Bay is part of the Karaka Bay-Worser Bay statistical area.

Education

The school is situated at the top of the hill between Seatoun Heights and Miramar Heights. It celebrated its centenary in 1997. It is the site of an old Māori Pā, Whetukairangi (Star Gazer).

References

External links
Worser Bay School
Worser Bay Life Saving Club Website
Worser Bay Boating Club

Bays of the Wellington Region
Suburbs of Wellington City
Beaches of the Wellington Region